WEC 45: Cerrone vs. Ratcliff was a mixed martial arts event held by World Extreme Cagefighting that took place on December 19, 2009 at The Pearl at The Palms in Las Vegas. It marked the first time the WEC has held back-to-back events at The Pearl at The Palms. The event drew an estimated 330,000 viewers on Versus.

Background
Damacio Page was originally slated to face Takeya Mizugaki at this event, but was pulled from the card and replaced by Scott Jorgensen.

Mackens Semerzier was once linked to a bout with Erik Koch at this event, but it was later confirmed that Koch would instead be facing Jameel Massouh.

Debuting featherweights Brandon Visher and Tyler Toner were scheduled to face each other at this event, but Toner was removed from the event and replaced by fellow WEC newcomer Courtney Buck. The Visher/Toner bout was rescheduled for WEC 48 the following April, where Toner won via TKO.

David Smith was supposed to make his WEC debut against John Hosman at this event, but was later pulled from the card due to injury and replaced by fellow WEC newcomer Chad George.

Results

Bonus Awards

Fighters were awarded $10,000 bonuses.

Fight of the Night:  Donald Cerrone vs.  Ed Ratcliff
Knockout of the Night:  Anthony Njokuani
Submission of the Night:  Brad Pickett

Fighters were awarded $5,000 bonuses.

Second Fight of the Night: Takeya Mizugaki vs.  Scott Jorgensen

Reported payout 
The following is the reported payout to the fighters as reported to the Nevada State Athletic Commission. It does not include sponsor money or "locker room" bonuses often given by the WEC and also do not include the WEC's traditional "fight night" bonuses.

Donald Cerrone: $24,000 (includes $12,000 win bonus) def. Ed Ratcliff: $9,000
Anthony Njokuani: $8,000 ($4,000 win bonus) def. Chris Horodecki: $12,000
Joseph Benavidez: $25,000 ($12,500 win bonus) def. Rani Yahya: $9,000
Scott Jorgensen: $14,000 ($7,000 win bonus) def. Takeya Mizugaki: $8,000
Bart Palaszewski: $10,000 ($5,000 win bonus) def. Anthony Pettis: $3,000
Zach Micklewright: $4,000 ($2,000 win bonus) def. Muhsin Corbbrey: $4,000 
Chad George: $5,000 ($2,000 win bonus) def. John Hosman: $3,000
Brandon Visher: $6,000 ($3,000 win bonus) def. Courtney Buck: $3,000
Brad Pickett: $6,000 ($3,000 win bonus) def. Kyle Dietz: $2,000
Erik Koch: $4,000 ($2,000 win bonus) def. Jameel Massouh: $3,000

See also
 World Extreme Cagefighting
 List of World Extreme Cagefighting champions
 List of WEC events
 2009 in WEC

External links
Official WEC website

References

World Extreme Cagefighting events
2009 in mixed martial arts
Mixed martial arts in Las Vegas
2009 in sports in Nevada
Palms Casino Resort